Chichester Station may refer to:
Chichester railway station, in Chichester, West Sussex, England
Chichester Metro station, Chichester, Tyne and Wear, England
Chichester Railroad Station, in New York state